Hellidon is a village and civil parish about  south-west of Daventry in Northamptonshire, England. The Leam and tributaries rise in the parish. The 2011 Census gave a population (with Lower and Upper Catesby) of 256, estimated at 286 in 2019. The long-distance Jurassic Way footpath linking Banbury, Oxfordshire, and Stamford, Lincolnshire, passes through. The origin of the name is unclear. "Holy Valley", "Haegla's Valley" and "Unstable valley" have been suggested, with the Old English "dun", meaning hill.

Manors
The Domesday Book of 1086 omits Hellidon. In the 12th century a manor of four hides (about 49 ha) at "Eliden" was recorded in the fee of Berkhamsted. From the 13th century Hellidon had two manors: Baskervilles and Giffords.

The present manor house at the north-west end occupies the site of the Baskervilles. Giffords Manor was on the north-east side – there are substantial rectilinear earthworks where the house is said to have stood. It had been abandoned by the time of Hellidon's 18th-century land surveys.

Church and chapel

Church of England
The Church of England parish church of St John the Baptist is Decorated Gothic in style, and so from late 13th or early 14th century. The west tower survives in its medieval condition, but in 1845–1847 the nave and chancel were heavily restored for the Rev C. S. Holthouse under the Gothic Revival architect William Butterfield. Twenty years later Butterfield designed the north aisle and the parish school, both were built in 1867. In 1897 a north aisle was added to the chancel, designed by Matthew Houlding. There is also a north transept. St John's is a Grade II* listed building.

The west tower has a ring of five bells. Hugh II Watts, who had foundries at Bedford and Leicester, cast the fourth bell in 1615 and the second, third and tenor in 1635. The Whitechapel Bell Foundry cast the treble bell in 1993.

Nonconformist
Hellidon had a Nonconformist chapel in Berry Lane. The building is now a private house.

Economic and social history

Until the 1770s an open field system of farming prevailed. There were five such fields, mapped in 1726 as Further Field, Lower Field, Middle Field, Upper Field and Short Attle Field. In 1774 Parliament passed an enclosure act for Hellidon, for which it was surveyed in 1775. There the earlier Middle Field was marked as Hill Field and Short Attle Field simply as Attle Field.

On Windmill Hill a tower mill was built in the late 18th or early 19th century. By 1973 it was derelict, but it has since been restored as an ancillary building for the Windmill Vineyard planted around it.

A Hellidon friendly society called the Institute, founded in 1805 still existed to mark its centenary in 1905.

The earliest record of a post office is from 1847. The first postmaster was John Wells, who described himself as a shoemaker in the 1841 Census, but a shopkeeper in 1849. By 1854 he appeared as "Postmaster and Letter Receiver".

The Grange, designed by William Butterfield and built for Rev. C. S. Holthouse, has a small core of an older house that Holthouse bought. The enlargement took place in 1850 and again in 1861. It is a Grade II* listed building.

Hellidon's highest recorded population was 449 in 1861.

In August 1904 a fire in Cox's Lane destroyed three thatched cottages.

Railways
It passed through the eastern edge of the parish in the  Catesby Tunnel, and was completed in 1897. One of the tunnel's five air shafts is in the parish. The station was closed in March 1963 and the line in September 1966.

From there it ran a  mineral railway down the Cherwell valley to take ironstone to the main line at Charwelton station. A steam locomotive called Charwelton was built for the line in 1917, worked it until 1942, and is now preserved on the Kent and East Sussex Railway.

Notable person
George Harry Dury (1916–1996), geographer and hydrologist, was born at Hellidon.

Amenities

Hellidon has a public house, the Red Lion. In January 2019 it still had a post office.

References

Sources

External links

Civil parishes in Northamptonshire
Villages in Northamptonshire
West Northamptonshire District